The 2009–10 Iowa Hawkeyes men's basketball team represented the University of Iowa in the 2009-10 college basketball season. The team was led by head coach Todd Lickliter and team played their home games at Carver-Hawkeye Arena, which has been their home since 1983. They were members of the Big Ten Conference. They finished the season 10–22, 4–14 in Big Ten play and lost in the first round of the 2010 Big Ten Conference men's basketball tournament.

At the end of the season, Lickliter was fired on March 15, 2010. He had gone 38-57 overall and 15-39 in Big Ten Conference games, the worst three-year stretch in program history.

2009-10 Schedule and Results
Source
All times are Central

|-
!colspan=9| Exhibition

|-
!colspan=9| Regular Season

|-
!colspan=9| Big Ten tournament

References

Iowa
Iowa Hawkeyes men's basketball seasons
Hawk
Hawk